The Befrienders is a British television series produced by the BBC in 1972.

The series dealt with the work of the Samaritans organisation, and the individual cases its staff came across. The leading cast members were Megs Jenkins and Michael Culver.

The Befrienders was first aired as a single play as part of the Drama Playhouse strand in 1970, which was followed by one series of eleven episodes. Of these eleven, nine are believed to exist.

External links
 

BBC television dramas
1972 British television series debuts
1972 British television series endings
1970s British drama television series